The men's 400 metre freestyle event at the 2020 Summer Olympics was held in 2021 at the Tokyo Aquatics Centre. It was the event's twenty-seventh consecutive appearance, having been held at every edition since 1904.

Records
Prior to this competition, the existing world and Olympic records were as follows.

No new records were set during the competition.

Qualification

 
The Olympic Qualifying Time for the event is 3:46.78. Up to two swimmers per National Olympic Committee (NOC) can automatically qualify by swimming that time at an approved qualification event. The Olympic Selection Time is 3:53.58. Up to one swimmer per NOC meeting that time is eligible for selection, allocated by world ranking until the maximum quota for all swimming events is reached. NOCs without a male swimmer qualified in any event can also use their universality place.

Competition format

The competition consists of two rounds: heats and a final. The swimmers with the best 8 times in the heats advance to the final. Swim-offs are used as necessary to break ties for advancement to the next round.

Schedule
All times are Japan Standard Time (UTC+9)

Results
The swimmers with the top 8 times, regardless of heat, advance to the final.

Heats

Final

References

Men's 00400 metre freestyle
Olympics
Men's events at the 2020 Summer Olympics